The 7th Maryland Regiment was authorized on 16 September 1776, for service with the Continental Army and was assigned on 27 December 1776. The regiment was composed of eight companies of volunteers organized from Frederick and Baltimore counties of the colony of Maryland.  On 22 May 1777, it was assigned to the 1st Maryland Brigade.  Re-organized on 12 May 1779 to nine companies. The 1st Maryland Brigade was reassigned to the Southern Department on 5 April 1780. The regiment participated in the Philadelphia Campaign which occurred during 1777-1778 and the Southern Theater which occurred during 1775–1782. The 7th Maryland Regiment was involved in the major battles including: Battle of Brandywine, Battle of Germantown, Battle of Monmouth, Battle of Camden and the Battle of Guilford Court House. The regiment was disbanded on 1 January 1783, at Annapolis, Maryland.

References

External links

Bibliography of the Continental Army in Maryland compiled by the United States Army Center of Military History

Maryland regiments of the Continental Army
Military units and formations established in 1776
Military units and formations disestablished in 1783
1776 establishments in Maryland
1783 disestablishments in Maryland